Ashland Junction is an unincorporated community located in the town of Eileen, Bayfield County, Wisconsin, United States.

History
Ashland Junction was founded in 1883. The community was named from its location at a rail junction outside of Ashland. This junction was between lines of the Omaha Road (later Chicago and North Western Railroad, or C&NW), and the Northern Pacific Railroad. The right-of-way of the east-west lines are now used for a rail trail known as the Tri-County Corridor.

A post office called Ashland Junction was established in 1890, and remained in operation until it was discontinued in 1910.

Notes

Unincorporated communities in Bayfield County, Wisconsin
Unincorporated communities in Wisconsin
Former Omaha Road stations
Former Northern Pacific Railway stations